The Chief of the General Staff (Montenegrin: Начелник Генералштаба / Načelnik Generalštaba) is the chief of the General Staff and Armed Forces of Montenegro. The chief of staff is appointed by the President of Montenegro, who is the commander-in-chief. The position dates back to the Principality of Montenegro. The current Chief of the General Staff is Brigadier general Milutin Đurović.

Chiefs of the General Staff (1878–1918)

For period from 1918 to 2006, see Chief of the General Staff of Yugoslavia.

Chiefs of the General Staff (2006–present)

See also
 Armed Forces of Montenegro

Notes

References

Military of Montenegro
Montenegro